Vine Street is a road in Hollywood, Los Angeles.

Vine Street may also refer to:
Vine Street (Philadelphia)
Vine Street, Cincinnati
Vine Street, Kansas City
Vine Street, London
Vine Street (Murray, Utah)
Vine Street (TV series), an early American soap opera television series which was broadcast in Los Angeles in 1938 and named after the road in Los Angeles
Interstate 676, also known as the Vine Street Expressway in Philadelphia
Ohio State Route 640, also known as Vine Street